Chrysomima is a genus of moths in the family Geometridae.

Species
 Chrysomima semilutearia (Felder & Rogenhofer, 1875)

References
 Chrysomima at Markku Savela's Lepidoptera and Some Other Life Forms
 Natural History Museum Lepidoptera genus database

Ennominae
Geometridae genera